Travis are an alternative rock band from Glasgow, Scotland, comprising Fran Healy (lead vocals, guitar, piano, banjo), Dougie Payne (bass guitar, backing vocals), Andy Dunlop (lead guitar, banjo, keyboards, backing vocals) and Neil Primrose (drums, percussion). Travis have twice been awarded British album of the year at the annual BRIT Awards, and are often credited with having paved the way for bands such as Coldplay, Keane and Snow Patrol. They have released nine studio albums, beginning with their debut, Good Feeling, in 1997. Their latest album, 10 Songs, was released in October 2020.

Albums

Studio albums

Live albums

Compilation albums

Singles

Other releases

Videos and DVDs

Other
2002: The Story So Far 1996–2002, a book documenting the history of the band between the titular years. Sold at the 2002 tour.

Covers of other artists
Songs that Travis have covered include:

Del Amitri's "Nothing Ever Happens"
Joni Mitchell's "River" and "Urge for Going"
The Band's "The Weight"
Mott the Hoople's "All the Young Dudes"
Elton John's "Rocket Man"
John Lennon's "Gimme Some Truth"
The Beatles' "Here Comes the Sun"
The Beatles' "Lovely Rita"
AC/DC's "Back in Black"
Elvis Presley's "Suspicious Minds"
Queen's "Killer Queen" with Jason Falkner
David Bowie's "Heroes" "Space Oddity"
The Ronettes' "Be My Baby"
Britney Spears' "...Baby One More Time"
Jimmy Webb's "Wichita Lineman"
Graham Nash's "Another Sleep Song"
Bob Dylan's "You're a Big Girl Now"
Carly Simon's "Nobody Does It Better"
Keane's "Somewhere Only We Know" (a modified live acoustic version titled "After Mark and Lard Go")
The Kinks' "Lola"
Katy Perry's "I Kissed a Girl"
Big Star's "Thirteen"
Squeeze's "Up the Junction", "Is That Love" and "Pulling Mussels (From the Shell)"
Paul McCartney's "Pipes of Peace"
Talking Heads' "Psycho Killer"
George Michael's "Faith"

Trivia
 "Love Will Come Through" was featured in Nick Jensen's section in Blueprint Skateboard's "Lost and Found" in 2005.
 "Closer" featured on a second-season episode of the ABC Family show Kyle XY.
 "Re-Offender" featured on a first-season episode of the CW show One Tree Hill.
 "Closer" also featured on the video game FIFA 08.
 Travis very briefly appeared as extras in the film Son of Rambow. The band cameoed as Sports, Science, History and English teachers similar to those in the "Driftwood" music video.
 "Sing" appeared on the NBC comedy television series The Office, first in 2005 and again in 2010.
 "My Eyes" was featured in the opening of the seventh episode of Season 7 of Smallville.
 "Turn" was used in the 2011 movie Feast of Love.
 The video to "Magnificent Time" appears briefly in "Mr Blobby's Question and Answer" on Mr Blobby's Youtube channel.

References

Discography
Discographies of British artists
Rock music group discographies